Konstantia Konstantina Sofokleous is a Cypriot artist working with video art, animation, drawing, and new technologies. Her work focuses on the violence in childhood tales, on tradition, rhythm, and materials, and has been exhibited, screened, and awarded at many International Exhibitions, Festivals, and Conferences around the world. In 2005 she represented Cyprus at the 51. Venice Biennale International Art Exhibition - 'Gravy Planet: A World Drawing' -  Cyprus Pavilion curated by Chus Martínez, with her works 'Popular Children's Poem' and 'Alice's Adventures in Wonderland'. She lives and works in Limassol, Cyprus.

References

External links

Official Website

1974 births
Living people
Greek Cypriot artists
People from Limassol
Cypriot women artists
Alumni of the University of Westminster
Video artists
New media artists
Women video artists
21st-century women artists